Leonard Humphrey Razzall, known as Humphrey Razzall (13 November 1912 – 26 October 1999), was a British Liberal Party politician and solicitor.

Background
He was a son of Horace Razzall a Scarborough teacher and Sarah Thompson. He was educated at Scarborough High School. He married, in 1936, Muriel Knowles. They had two sons. Muriel died in 1968. In 1975 he married Mary Elmore Bland.

Professional career
He was admitted as a solicitor in 1935. He founded the firm Humphrey Razzall & Co. in 1938. He served in the Royal Marines from 1941 to 1946, reaching the rank of Staff Captain. He was an Examiner in the High Court practice and procedure for solicitors final examination. He was the Master of the Supreme Court (Taxing) from 1954 to 1981.

Political career

He was selected as the Liberal Party's prospective parliamentary candidate for Finchley for a general election expected to take place in the Autumn of 1939. Although it was a safe Conservative seat, the Liberals had come second in 1935, so it was a promising seat. However, due to the outbreak of war, Razzall never got to fight the seat. He did continue with the duties of prospective candidate, attending meetings while on leave

By the time Winston Churchill called a general election in 1945, Razzall had moved from being Liberal candidate for Finchley to be adopted as Liberal candidate for his home town seat of Scarborough and Whitby. This was a better prospect for the Liberals, who had finished a strong second behind the Conservatives in 1935. However, the national swing to the Labour Party, prevented the Liberal Party from gaining the seat;

He did not stand for parliament again.

Publications
A Man of Law’s Tale, (1982)
Law, love and laughter, (1984)

Tim Razzall
One of his sons, Tim Razzall, is a prominent Liberal Democrat and a member of the House of Lords.

References

1912 births
1999 deaths
Liberal Party (UK) parliamentary candidates
Razzall family
Politicians from Scarborough, North Yorkshire
People educated at Scarborough High School for Boys